Clemens-Brentano-Preis of the city of Heidelberg is a literary prize of Germany. It was established in 1993, and named after the German poet Clemens Brentano (1778–1842). The prize money is €10,000.

Recipients
Source:

 1993 Günter Coufal for Am Fenster
 1995 Gabriele Kögl for Das Mensch
 1996 Barbara Köhler for Blue Box, Jörg Schieke for Die Rosen zitieren die Adern
 1997 Daniel Zahno for Doktor Turban
 1998 Benjamin Korn for Kunst, Macht und Moral
 1999 Norbert Niemann for Wie man's nimmt
 2000 Oswald Egger for Herde der Rede and Der Rede Dreh, Hendrik Rost for Fliegende Schatten
 2001 Sabine Peters for Nimmersatt
 2002 Doron Rabinovici for Credo und Credit
 2003 Andreas Maier for Klausen
 2004 Raphael Urweider for Das Gegenteil von Fleisch
 2005 Anna Katharina Hahn for Kavaliersdelikt
 2006 Stefan Weidner for Mohammedanische Versuchungen
 2007 Clemens Meyer for Als wir träumten
 2008 Ann Cotten for Fremdwörterbuchsonette
 2009 Andreas Stichmann for Jackie in Silber, Felicia Zeller for Einsam lehnen am Bekannten
 2010 Sven Hillenkamp for Das Ende der Liebe. Gefühle im Zeitalter unendlicher Freiheit
 2011 Wolfgang Herrndorf for Tschick
 2012 Alexander Gumz for Ausrücken mit Modellen
 2013 Philipp Schönthaler for Nach oben ist das Leben offen. Erzählungen
 2014 Maximilian Probst for Der Drahtesel. Die letzte humane Technik
 2015 Saskia Hennig von Lange for the novel Zurück zum Feuer
 2016 Thilo Krause for Um die Dinge ganz zu lassen
 2017 Jan Snela for Milchgesicht. Ein Bestiarium der Liebe
 2018 Philipp Stadelmaier for Die mittleren Regionen. Über Terror und Meinung
 2019 Gianna Molinari for Hier ist noch alles möglich
 2020 Levin Westermann for bezüglich der schatten
 2021 Simon Sailer for Die Schrift
 2022 Hanna Engelmeier for Trost. Vier Übungen

References

External links
 

German literary awards
1993 establishments in Germany
Awards established in 1993